There are at least two national parks named Sierra Nevada:

 Sierra Nevada National Park (Spain) in the autonomous community of Andalusia
 Sierra Nevada National Park (Venezuela) in the states of Mérida and Barinas

See also 
Sierra Nevada de Santa Marta National Park